San Agustin Church may refer to:
Iglesia San Agustín, Chile
Church of San Agustín (Quito), a church in Ecuador
Church of San Agustín, Lima, a church in Peru
San Agustin Church (Manila), a church in the Philippines
San Agustin Church (Lubao), a church in Pampanga, Philippines
Cathedral of San Agustin, a church in Laredo, Texas, U.S.

See also
St. Augustine's Church (disambiguation)